Let It Go is the fourth full-length LP from reggae rock band State Radio.
It was released on September 29, 2009. It is notable for being the first State Radio release available in vinyl format.

Tracks

Personnel
State Radio
Chadwick Stokes - vocals, guitars, trombone
Chuck Fay - bass guitar, vocals, melodica, mellotron, B3 organ, rhodes
Mike "Maddog" Najarian - drums, percussion, vocals

Additional Musicians
Don Monks - odds and ends
Ben Urmston - backing vocals and trumpet
Matt Embree - backing vocals on Still and Silent
Jazer Giles - squeeze box, organ
Aaron Dembe - backing vocals
Dr. Ronnie Simonsen - tape cassette message

References

2009 albums
State Radio albums